Craig v. Boren, 429 U.S. 190 (1976), was a landmark decision of the US Supreme Court ruling that statutory or administrative sex classifications were subject to intermediate scrutiny under the Fourteenth Amendment's Equal Protection Clause.

Background 
Oklahoma passed a statute prohibiting the sale of "nonintoxicating" 3.2% beer to males under the age of 21 but allowed females over the age of 18 to purchase it. The statute was challenged as a Fourteenth Amendment's Equal Protection Clause violation by Curtis Craig, a male who was over 18 but under 21, and Carolyn Whitener, an Oklahoma vendor of alcohol.  The nominal defendant was David Boren, who was sued ex officio by virtue of his serving as Governor of Oklahoma at the time of the lawsuit. Ruth Bader Ginsburg, working as an attorney for the American Civil Liberties Union, advised the plaintiff's attorney, submitted an amicus brief, and was present at counsel table during oral argument before the Supreme Court.

The Supreme Court was called upon to determine whether a statute that denied the sale of beer to individuals of the same age based on their gender violated the Equal Protection Clause. Also, the Supreme Court examined for jus tertii (third-party rights), in this case the vendor of the 3.2% beer.

Decision 
Justice William J. Brennan delivered the opinion of the Court in which he was joined by justices White, Marshall, Powell and Stevens (Justice Blackmun joined all but one part of the opinion, and Blackmun, Powell, Stevens, and Stewart wrote concurrences).

Majority opinion
The Court held that the gender classifications made by the Oklahoma statute were unconstitutional because the statistics relied on by the state were insufficient to show a substantial relationship between the statute and the benefits intended to stem from it.

The Court instituted a standard, dubbed "intermediate scrutiny," under which the state must prove the existence of specific important governmental objectives, and the law must be substantially related to the achievement of those objectives.

As to third-party rights, the court, expanding on the doctrine of standing, held that the vendors of 3.2% beer would be economically affected by the restrictive nature of the sales to males between 18 and 20. To have standing, one must show a "nexus" of the injury to oneself and the constitutional violation of the statute. In this case, the statute directly affected Whitener only economically, but the Supreme Court explained that Whitener and other vendors have standing to assert concomitant rights of other parties, such as Craig.

The Court acknowledged that parties economically affected by regulations may challenge them "by acting as advocates of the rights of third parties who seek access to their market or function."

Concurring opinion
Justice Blackmun wrote a concurring opinion, agreeing that a higher standard of scrutiny was appropriate.

Dissenting opinions 
Chief Justice Burger and Justice Rehnquist dissented.

Rehnquist dissented because he felt that the law needed to pass only "rational basis," as previous cases in the area, such as Stanton v. Stanton, had used only the "rational basis" test.

Burger was "in general agreement with Mr. Justice Rehnquist's dissent" but penned a separate dissent to emphasize that "a litigant may only assert his own constitutional rights or immunities." He felt that the indirect economic injury to Whitener and other vendors introduced "a new concept of constitutional standing to which I cannot subscribe."

See also 
Frontiero v. Richardson
Gender equality
List of gender equality lawsuits
List of United States Supreme Court cases, volume 429

Sources

References

External links 

1976 in United States case law
Alcohol law in the United States
Gender discrimination lawsuits
History of civil rights in the United States
Legal history of Oklahoma
United States men's rights case law
Ruth Bader Ginsburg
United States Supreme Court decisions that overrule a prior Supreme Court decision
United States equal protection case law
United States Twenty-first Amendment case law
United States Supreme Court cases
United States Supreme Court cases of the Burger Court
1976 in Oklahoma
Legal drinking age